The 1934 Rice Owls football team was an American football team that represented Rice University as a member of the Southwest Conference (SWC) during the 1934 college football season. In its first season under head coach Jimmy Kitts, the team compiled a 9–1–1 record (5–1 against SWC opponents), won the conference championship, and outscored opponents by a total of 204 to 44.

Schedule

References

Rice
Rice Owls football seasons
Southwest Conference football champion seasons
Rice Owls football